The 32nd Assembly District of Wisconsin is one of 99 districts in the Wisconsin State Assembly. Located in southeast Wisconsin, the district comprises most of the southern half of Walworth County as well as a portion of western Kenosha County.  It includes the cities of Delavan and Lake Geneva, as well as the villages of East Troy, Fontana-on-Geneva Lake, Genoa City, Sharon, and Walworth.  It also contains the Big Foot Beach State Park, the Geneva National Golf Club, and Grand Geneva Resort Airport.  The seat is represented by Republican Tyler August since January 2011.

The 32nd Assembly district is located within Wisconsin's 11th Senate district, along with the 31st and 33rd Assembly districts.

List of past representatives

References 

Wisconsin State Assembly districts
Kenosha County, Wisconsin
Racine County, Wisconsin
Walworth County, Wisconsin